The 2018 Southern Miss Golden Eagles football team represented the University of Southern Mississippi in the 2018 NCAA Division I FBS football season. The Golden Eagles played their home games at the M. M. Roberts Stadium in Hattiesburg, Mississippi and competed in the West Division of Conference USA (C–USA). They were led by third-year head coach Jay Hopson. They finished the season 6–5, 5–3 in C-USA play to finish in a three-way tie for second in the West Division. Despite being bowl eligible, they were not invited to a bowl game.

Previous season
The Golden Eagles finished the 2017 season 8–5, 6–2 in C-USA play to finish in a tie for second place in the West Division. They were invited to the Independence Bowl where they lost to Florida State.

Preseason

Award watch lists

C-USA preseason awards
On July 16, 2018, Conference USA released their preseason awards, including the preseason all-CUSA team. Kicker Paker Shaunfield was selected as the preseason special teams player of the year. He was the only player named to the all-CUSA team.

Preseason media poll
Conference USA released their preseason media poll on July 17, 2018, with the Golden Eagles predicted to finish in fourth place in the West Division.

Schedule

Schedule Source:

Game summaries

Jackson State

Louisiana–Monroe

Rice

at Auburn

at North Texas

UTSA

at Charlotte

Marshall

at UAB

Louisiana Tech

at UTEP

References

Southern Miss
Southern Miss Golden Eagles football seasons
Southern Miss Golden Eagles football